Charles Daniel Smith (born July 16, 1965) is an American former professional basketball player who played in the National Basketball Association (NBA).

College career
As a college player, Smith was named Big East Player of the Year in 1988. He was a member of the University of Pittsburgh's highly touted five-man recruiting class considered the country's best. Along with power forward Jerome Lane, Charles Smith and the Pitt Basketball Team became a major force in college basketball, opening the 1987–88 season ranked No. 4 nationally and rising as high as No. 2. during Smith's tenure.

He played for the US national team in the 1986 FIBA World Championship, where he won the gold medal, and at the 1988 Olympics, where he finished with a bronze.

NBA career
After his college career, the 6'10", 245 lb. power forward was selected 3rd overall in the 1988 NBA draft by the Philadelphia 76ers but immediately traded to the Los Angeles Clippers. He made the 1988 NBA All-Rookie Team by averaging 16 points and 8 rebounds. During his four years with the Clippers where he was among the team's top scorers and rebounders, he averaged 19 points and 7 rebounds. He was later traded to the New York Knicks with Doc Rivers and Bo Kimble for point guard Mark Jackson. Smith was expected to fill the hole at small forward left by Xavier McDaniel after the Knicks failed to re-sign him after their successful 1991–92 season, a role that Smith struggled in as he was primarily a power forward. His knees became more problematic playing small forward around this time. As Smith's stats declined, he was traded to the San Antonio Spurs for J. R. Reid before retiring in 1998.

Post-retirement
Smith is a Managing Consultant for Silver Blade which extends cash invoices and will advance cash against unbilled transaction in the media industry. Prior, he was Head of Sports & Entertainment for MediaCom, owned by WPP/GroupM. 
 
After retiring from the NBA, Smith served as Team Representative for the National Basketball Players Association (NBPA) and then as First Vice President. Smith helped create the NBPA Foundation, a non-profit to support retired players in need. Smith went on to serve as Executive Director of the National Basketball Retired Players Association (NBRPA). Smith produced and executed exhibition games featuring over 40 retired NBA players. 
 
Smith was founder and CEO of New Media Technology Corp and then Head of New Business Opportunities for Midas Exchange.

NBA career statistics

Regular season 

|-
| style="text-align:left;"| 
| style="text-align:left;"|L.A. Clippers
| 71 || 56 || 30.4 || .495 || .000 || .725 || 6.5 || 1.5 || 1.0 || 1.3 || 16.3
|-
| style="text-align:left;"| 
| style="text-align:left;"|L.A. Clippers
| 78 || 76 || 35.0 || .520 || .083 || .794 || 6.7 || 1.5 || 1.1 || 1.5 || 21.1
|-
| style="text-align:left;"| 
| style="text-align:left;"|L.A. Clippers
| 74 || 74 || 36.5 || .469 || .000 || .793 || 8.2 || 1.8 || 1.1 || 2.0 || 20.0
|-
| style="text-align:left;"| 
| style="text-align:left;"|L.A. Clippers
| 49 || 25 || 26.7 || .466 || .000 || .785 || 6.1 || 1.1 || 0.8 || 2.0 || 14.6
|-
| style="text-align:left;"| 
| style="text-align:left;"|New York
| 81 || 68 || 26.8 || .469 || .000 || .782 || 5.3 || 1.8 || 0.6 || 1.2 || 12.4
|-
| style="text-align:left;"| 
| style="text-align:left;"|New York
| 43 || 21 || 25.7 || .443 || .500 || .719 || 3.8 || 1.2 || 0.6 || 1.0 || 10.4
|-
| style="text-align:left;"| 
| style="text-align:left;"|New York
| 76 || 58 || 28.3 || .471 || .226 || .792 || 4.3 || 1.6 || 0.6 || 1.3 || 12.7
|-
| style="text-align:left;"| 
| style="text-align:left;"|New York
| 41 || 4 || 21.7 || .388 || .133 || .709 || 3.9 || 0.7 || 0.4 || 1.2 || 7.4
|-
| style="text-align:left;"| 
| style="text-align:left;"|San Antonio
| 32 || 30 || 25.8 || .458 || – || .767 || 6.3 || 1.1 || 1.0 || 0.9 || 9.6
|-
| style="text-align:left;"| 
| style="text-align:left;"|San Antonio
| 19 || 7 || 17.3 || .405 || .000 || .769 || 3.4 || 0.7 || 0.7 || 1.2 || 4.6
|- class="sortbottom"
| style="text-align:center;" colspan="2"| Career
| 564 || 419 || 29.0 || .475 || .194 || .774 || 5.8 || 1.4 || 0.8 || 1.4 || 14.4

Playoffs 

|-
|style="text-align:left;"|1992
|style="text-align:left;”|L.A. Clippers
|5||5||29.6||.393||–||.933||5.6||1.8||0.8||2.4||11.6
|-
|style="text-align:left;"|1993
|style="text-align:left;”|New York
|15||15||25.9||.471||–||.740||4.0||1.3||0.6||0.9||11.1
|-
|style="text-align:left;"|1994
|style="text-align:left;”|New York
|25||18||24.5||.480||.000||.729||3.8||1.0||0.5||1.0||8.8
|-
|style="text-align:left;"|1995
|style="text-align:left;”|New York
|11||11||27.5||.537||.000||.567||3.8||1.2||1.2||1.5||10.8
|-
|style="text-align:left;"|1996
|style="text-align:left;”|San Antonio
|10||8||16.5||.500||–||.375||3.7||1.0||0.7||1.0||5.1
|- class="sortbottom"
| style="text-align:center;" colspan="2"| Career
| 66 || 57 || 24.5 || .481 || .000 || .705 || 4.0 || 1.2 || 0.7 || 1.2 || 9.3

References

External links

1965 births
Living people
20th-century African-American sportspeople
21st-century African-American people
1986 FIBA World Championship players
African-American basketball players
All-American college men's basketball players
American men's basketball players
American people of Cape Verdean descent
Basketball players at the 1988 Summer Olympics
Basketball players from Connecticut
Competitors at the 1986 Goodwill Games
FIBA World Championship-winning players
Los Angeles Clippers players
McDonald's High School All-Americans
Medalists at the 1988 Summer Olympics
New York Knicks players
Parade High School All-Americans (boys' basketball)
Philadelphia 76ers draft picks
Pittsburgh Panthers men's basketball players
Power forwards (basketball)
Olympic bronze medalists for the United States in basketball
San Antonio Spurs players
Sportspeople from Bridgeport, Connecticut
United States men's national basketball team players
Warren Harding High School alumni